Lewis River may refer to:

Lewis River (Alaska)
Lewis River (Canterbury), New Zealand
Lewis River (West Coast), New Zealand
Lewis River (Washington)
Lewis River (Wyoming)
the former name of the Snake River in the United States

See also 
 Lewis Bridge (disambiguation)
 Lewis (disambiguation)